Tamar Galbats (30 September 1957 – 29 November 2022) was an Israeli writer and journalist. She won the 2008 Prime Minister's Prize for Hebrew Literary Works.

Life 
Galbats studied at University of Haifa, and Tel Aviv University. She was the film critic for the Haaretz supplement, and she was a reporter at Ha'aud and Ha'eir.. She was a senior editor at Maariv. She was one of the founders of the Maariv culture supplement, and served as the newspaper's television critic. In the mid-1990s , she wrote for the "Florentine " television series, and was the editor of Gal Uchovsky's "Small Circle" cultural program on Channel 2.

In 1994, she published the essay "We are all ants in a caravan" in the collection of essays People Died of Fear, which dealt with Israel in the Gulf War. In 2004, her story "Peas" was selected at the "Haaretz" newspaper short story contest. In 2004, she published her first novel , "You're in a good time" and in 2006, she published "Makuplet", her second book. In 2008, her book "Makufel" was nominated for the Sapir Award.

Works 
 את בתקופה טובה (You're in a good time) 2004.  
 מקופלת (Folded), 2006,
 המתים והחיים מאוד (The Dead and the Very Much Alive) (2013)

Works in English 
 Dome, illustrator Gil Marco Shani, Revolver; 2006.

References 

1957 births
2022 deaths
Israeli journalists
Israeli novelists